Palakonda is a town in Parvathipuram Manyam district of the Indian state of Andhra Pradesh. It is a nagar panchayat and the mandal headquarters of Palakonda mandal in Palakonda revenue division

Geography 
It has an average elevation of 44 meters (147 feet).

Demography 
The cultivated land is irrigated by the Nagavali River. The population in 1901 was 215,376 compared with 201,331 in 1891. There were two towns Palkonda and Razam and 334 villages. The Agency area had population of about 11,000 people, chiefly Savaras living in 106 villages. The greater part of Taluk was held on Ryotwari and belongs to Rajas of Bobbili and Vizianagram.

It was within Ganjam District of Orissa state till 1950 when Srikakulam district was formed.

Government and politics 
Palakonda Nagar panchayat is a civic body constituted in the year 2013. The present municipal commissioner of the town is B. Ramu.

Assembly constituency 
Palakonda is an assembly constituency in Andhra Pradesh reserved for Scheduled Castes. There were 120,726 registered voters in this constituency in 1999 elections. Now from 2009 onwards the Assembly Constituency reservation changed to S.T.

List of elected members:

 GENERAL SEAT
1951 – Sri Palavalasa Sangam Naidu
 RESERVED FOR SCHEDULE CASTE
1978 – Sri Kambala Rajaratnam
1983 – Sri Gonipati Syamala Rao 
1985 – Sri Tale Bhadrayya 
1989 – Smt Amrutha Kumari P.J.
1994 – Sri Tale Bhadrayya 
1999 - Smt Amrutha Kumari P.J. 
2004 – Sri Kambala Jogulu
 RESERVED FOR SCHEDULE TRIBE
2009 – Sri Nimmaka Sugreevulu 
2014 – Smt Viswasarai Kalavathi

References 

Cities and towns in Andhra Pradesh
2013 establishments in Andhra Pradesh